Bent Brask (born 30 March 1958) is a Norwegian former swimmer. He competed in the men's 4 × 200 metre freestyle relay at the 1976 Summer Olympics.

References

External links
 

1958 births
Living people
Olympic swimmers of Norway
Swimmers at the 1976 Summer Olympics
People from Frogn
Norwegian male freestyle swimmers
Sportspeople from Viken (county)
20th-century Norwegian people